Tom Russell is an American singer-songwriter. His discography consists of 29 studio albums, 3 live albums, 11 compilations, 3 videos, 3 EPs, 9 singles and 1 tribute album. In addition, his compositions have been featured on a number of albums by other artists.

Studio recordings

Live albums

Compilation albums

Videos

EPs

Singles

Guest singles

Tribute albums

As primary artist/contributor
 1994: various artists- Tulare Dust: A Songwriters' Tribute to Merle Haggard (HighTone) - track 1, "Tulare Dust / They're Tearin' The Labor Camps Down" (reissued in 2014 with bonus concert disc)
 2000: various artists - Seka ["Sister"] Vol. 2 (Twah!) - track 10, "Veteran's Day"
 2003: various artists - Kerrville Folk Festival: Early Years 1972-1981 (Silverwolf) track 5-13, "Second Time Around" and track 6-07, "Joshua Tree" (both with Patricia Hardin)
 2003: various artists- Kerrville Folk Festival Highlights (Silverwolf) - track 2, "Mineral Wells"
 2005: various artists -  KGSR Broadcasts Vol. 13 (KGSR) - track 1-04, "Tonight We Ride"
 2006: various artists - A Case for Case: A Tribute to the Songs of Peter Case (Hungry For Music) - track 1-04, "A Little Wind (Could Blow Me Away)"
 2007: various artists - The Gift: A Tribute To Ian Tyson (Stony Plain) - track 10, "Old Cheyenne"
 2009: various artists - Man of Somebody's Dreams, A Tribute to Chris Gaffney (Yep Roc) - track 6, "If Daddy Don't Sing Danny Boy"
 2010: various artists - KPIG Greatest Hits Vol. 3 (Quilted Fish) - track 2, "Blue Wing" (with Dave Alvin)

As composer

1979–1995
 1979: A Grain Of Salt - High Energy Grass (Hi Spot) - track 3, "Leprechaun Reel" (co-written with Gary Smith)
 1986: Nanci Griffith - The Last of the True Believers (Philo) - track 3, "St. Olav's Gate"
 1987: Ian Tyson - Cowboyography (Sugar Hill) - track 1, "Navajo Rug"; track 6, "Claude Dallas"
 1988: Nanci Griffith - Little Love Affairs (MCA) - track 9, "Outbound Plane"
 1989: Sylvia Tyson - You Were On My Mind (Stony Plain) - track 4, "Walking On The Moon" (co-written with Katy Moffatt) and track 5, "Thrown To The Wolves" (co-written with Sylvia Tyson)
 1990: Desert Rose Band - Pages of Life (MCA) - track 3, "Missing You" (co-written with Chris Hillman and Richard Sellars)
 1990: Suzanne Klee - California Blue (Baur Music) - track 3, "Walkin' On The Moon" (co-written with Katy Moffat)
 1995: Peter Case - Torn Again (Vanguard) - track 7, "A Little Wind (Could Blow Me Away)" (co-written with Peter Case)
 1995: Any Old Time - Crossing (Dara) - track 13, "Saint Olav's Gate"
 1995: The Hitchin' Post - Roadmap (Glitterhouse) - track 11, "One And One"
 1995: Quartette - Work Of The Heart (Denon) - track 10, "Street Of The Mariachi" (co-written with Sylvia Tyson)

1996 – present
 1996: Bob Neuwirth - Look Up (Watermelon) - track 5, "Beyond The Blues" (co-written with Peter Case and Bob Neuwirth)
 1996: Katy Moffatt and Kate Brislin - Sleepless Nights (Rounder) - track 11, "I'll Take The Blame" (co-written with Katy Moffatt)
 1998: Dave Alvin - Blackjack David (HighTone) - track 4, "California Snow" (co-written with Dave Alvin)
 1999: Ramblin' Jack Elliott - The Long Ride (HighTone) - track 8, "The Sky Above And The Mud Below"
 2001: Suzy Bogguss - Live At Caffe Milano (Loyal Dutchess) - track 12, "Outbound Plane" (co-written with Nanci Griffith)
 2002: Dave Alvin and the Guilty Men - Out in California (HighTone) - track 1, "Out In California" and track 2, "Haley's Comet" (both songs co-written with Dave Alvin)
 2004: Dave Alvin - Ashgrove (Yep Roc) - track 2, "Rio Grande" (co-written with Dave Alvin)
 2005: Chris Hillman - The Other Side (Sovereign Artists) - track 11, "Missing You" (co-written with Chris Hillman and Richard Sellers)
 2005: Dave Alvin and the Guilty Men - The Great American Music Galaxy (Yep Roc) - track 12, "Out In California" (co-written with Dave Alvin)
 2006: Dave Alvin - West of the West (Yep Roc) - track 9, "Between The Cracks" (co-written with Dave Alvin)
 2011: Dead Rock West - Bright Morning Stars (Red River) - track 4, "Beyond the Blues" (co-written with Bob Neuwirth and Peter Case)
 2012: Gretchen Peters - Hello Cruel World (Proper / Scarlet Letter) - track 2, "Saint Francis" (co-written with Gretchen Peters)
 2012: Marley's Ghost - Jubilee (Sage Arts) - track 9, "Hank and Audrey" (co-written with Katy Moffatt)
 2015: Ian Tyson - Carnero Vaquero (Stony Plain) - track 9, "Wolves No Longer Sing" (co-written with Ian Tyson)

As producer
 1993: Katy Moffatt - The Greatest Show On Earth (Philo)
 1994: Sylvia Tyson - Gypsy Cadillac (Round Tower)

Also appears on
 1972: Sailcat - Motorcycle Mama (Elektra) - banjo

References

External links
Official Website
 
 

Discographies of American artists
Rock music discographies
Folk music discographies
Country music discographies